Limnococcus is a genus of cyanobacteria belonging to the family Chroococcaceae.

The genus has almost cosmopolitan distribution.

Species:
 Limnococcus limneticus (Lemmerm.) J.Komárková et al.

References

Chroococcales
Cyanobacteria genera